Kishori Pednekar born 25 December 1962 is an Indian politician served as the Mayor of Brihanmumbai Municipal Corporation (BMC),   which is India's richest municipal corporation. She was elected as Mayor without any opposition. She worked as a nurse earlier on and once again in 2020, this time to motivate other healthcare workers during COVID-19 pandemic.

She was awarded Newsmakers Achievers Awards in 2022.

Early career
She joined Shiv Sena after her marriage. She became corporator in 2002 from Lower Parel area in Mumbai. Currently she is a part of Shiv Sena (Uddhav Balasaheb Thackeray) party.

Positions held
 2002: Elected as corporator in Brihanmumbai Municipal Corporation (Ward No 52)
 2012: Re-elected as corporator in Brihanmumbai Municipal Corporation (Ward 191)
 2017: Re-Elected as corporator in Brihanmumbai Municipal Corporation (Ward 199).
 2019: Elected as Mayor of Brihanmumbai Municipal Corporation

References

External links
  Shivsena Home Page 

Mayors of Mumbai
Shiv Sena politicians
1962 births
Living people